AH-Software is the software brand of AHS Co., Ltd., an importer of digital audio workstations and encoders in Tokyo, Japan. It is also known as the developer of Voiceroid and a number of Vocaloid voicebanks.

Products and services

Vocaloid Products
AHS released their first Vocaloids on December 4, 2009, named SF-A2 Miki, Kaai Yuki, and Hiyama Kiyoteru. Kaai Yuki became the first Vocaloid to use a child's voice. AHS also published a Hello Kitty-based Vocaloid, "Nekomura Iroha", based on the Kittyler featured in the game Hello Kitty to Issho! Block Crash 123!! in cooperation with Sanrio. AHS are also heading the first project led by producers working with the software.

Vocaloid 2 Products

Vocaloid 3 Products

Vocaloid 4 Products

Vocaloid 5 Products

Speech Synthesis
Voiceroid
Tsukuyomi Shouta; based on a seven-year-old male.
Tsukuyomi Ai; based on a five-year-old female.
Yoshida-Kun; based on the character from Eagle Talon.
Tsurumaki Maki; a teenage female musician voiced by Tomoe Tamiyasu.
Yuzuki Yukari
Tohoku Zunko; a teenage female created to promote the recovery of the Tohoku region. She was released as a Vocaloid on June 5, 2014.
Kotonoha Akane・Aoi; two females that are a pair of sisters.
Minase Kou; a male teacher (like Hiyama Kiyoteru).
Kyomachi Seika; a young adult female voiced by Rika Tachibana and produced in collaboration with Tsukurujyo, a production group based in Seika, Kyoto. She was adopted as the district mascot.
Tohoku Kiritan; Zunko's youngest sister, a preteen voiced by Himika Akaneya. Produced in collaboration with SSS Co., Ltd.
Kizuna Akari
Haruno Sora
Tohoku Itako; Zunko and Kiritan's oldest sister, a young adult voiced by Ibuki Kido. Also a collaboration with SSS Co., Ltd.
Tsuina-chan; based on the character Tsuina the Ogre Hunter, a teenage female voiced by Mai Kadowaki who can speak both Standard and Kansai dialects.
Iori Yuzuru; a young male with androgynous design, produced in collaboration with AI Inc.

Sound editing and recording
Crazy Talk SE.
Jam Band

References

External links 

Software companies of Japan
Software companies based in Tokyo
Vocaloid production companies
Japanese brands
Software companies established in 2005
Japanese companies established in 2005